Marc Horowitz (born July 19, 1976, Columbus, Ohio) is an American artist who works in a large variety of media including painting, drawing, sculpture, photography, performance and video.

Biography
Marc Horowitz is a Los Angeles-based artist working in painting, performance, video, photography, sculpture, and social practice. He combines traditional drawing and painting styles, commercial photography, and new media to explore entertainment, class, commerce, failure, success, and personal meaning. At age seventeen, he attended Indiana University Bloomington, receiving his degree in Business Marketing and Microeconomics. He went on to attend the San Francisco Art Institute, where he studied painting. He completed a Master of Fine Arts at The University of Southern California in 2012. At USC, he studied with Charlie White, Sharon Lockhart, Evan Holloway and Frances Stark. He has had solo exhibitions shown with Johannes Vogt, Ever Gold [Projects], China Art Objects, the Depart Foundation, Bank Gallery, Mannerheim Gallery, and Coma Gallery, amongst others.

Career
In 2003, Horowitz and a longtime collaborator, Jon Brumit, reinvented themselves as the business team of Sliv & Dulet Enterprises and opened an office in downtown San Francisco (at New Langton Arts). They staffed their company with 30 people (artists) of various backgrounds to help them "develop a summer line of products and services," which they pitched to local businesses. Some examples included a fog removal initiative for the Golden Gate Bridge, a full-service office in a tent, and a Swiss Army Cubicle.

In 2005, Horowitz gained national attention while working on a catalog shoot for Crate & Barrel. He wrote "Dinner w/ Marc" along with his cell number on a dry-erase board featured in a home office shot for the catalog. When the catalog was distributed, Horowitz received more than 30,000 phone calls. He spent the following year driving across the country and having dinner with individuals that had called. This project was named "The National Dinner Tour". He was also given the distinction by People magazine to be added to their list of the "50 Most Eligible Bachelors".

In 2007, he had a show "More Better" at AMT Gallery in Como, Italy, "The Center for Improved Living" at Analix Forever in Geneva, Switzerland, and "Breakthrough" at Nuke Gallery in Paris, France. In 2008, Horowitz presented "The Me and You Show" at the prestigious Hayward Gallery in London, England.

In the Summer of 2008, Horowitz completed "The Signature Series." The series chronicled his journey across America as he drove along the shape of his signature.  During the trip, Horowitz made 19 stops. For one of the stops, he started an "Anonymous Semi-nudist Colony" in Nampa, Idaho. He stopped in Craig, Colorado to bury people's problems in a public park plot. He even made a commercial for his high school. For his last stop on the series, Horowitz stopped at Wrightsville Beach where he froze a briefcase in the middle of a  patriotic ice sculpture challenged passers-by to guess when they think the ice will melt. The winner was awarded the suitcase and the surprise inside.  He filmed all his stops and they are available on YouTube.

During December, 2008, Horowitz attempted to bail out the US's banks by creating action paintings that he gave to various banks to sell at auctions.

From November 2008 through February 2009, Horowitz broadcast his life live 24/7 on the internet for a live audience as Talkshow 247.  During this time he faced eviction from his apartment, hitchhiked across Los Angeles, hosted Thanksgiving Island, married his long-time true love and had several death threats from his downstairs neighbor.

From August 10 through August 18, 2009, Peter Baldes and Horowitz made the first virtual live-streaming broadcast cross-country road trip, calling it "Google Maps Road Trip." Using only Google Maps, they drove from Los Angeles to Richmond, Virginia. They were interviewed by NPR Weekend Edition for their innovative "vacation." They streamed live on ustream.tv.

From November 1–30, 2010, with support from Creative Time, Marc crowdsourced his daily decisions on his "The Advice of Strangers" website. People were able to visit the site www.theadviceofstrangers.com and vote in real time on the choices he made every day.

Marc was one of 25 artists to receive AOL's 25 for 25 grant, a $25,000 artist life grant, in November 2010 for his exemplary work.

Marc graduated from the University of Southern California Roski School of Fine Arts with a Master of Fine Arts in May 2012.

Marc has lectured at Yale, Berkeley, CalArts, Portland State, among many other universities and establishments. In November 2012, Marc did a TEDx talk in Lake Como, Italy. Marc's film "Moving" was an official selection of the 2014 Slamdance Film Festival. He has taught at OTIS and USC in the new media departments.

Marc released hCoin in 2015, Horowitz's virtual "crypto"currency and e-commerce site. This same year, Marc moved away from internet-based work, video and performance and made a return to painting. His first large scale painting show was at the Depart Foundation in Los Angeles. Curator Lindsay Howard interviewed Horowitz for Hyperallergic specifically about his shift from digital arts to painting. More about Horowitz's shift to painting is revealed in Christopher Michno's article and in-depth career overview published in Artillery.

References

External links

Marc Horowitz's site
Marc Horowitz and ’The Center for Improved Living‘ - Time Out article on "The Me & You Show" at the Hayward Gallery
A man, a mule and a mission -- Conceptual artist Marc Horowitz tests a new/old way to run errands through the streets of San Francisco - San Francisco Chronicle article

New media artists
American Internet celebrities
American conceptual artists
San Francisco Art Institute alumni
Kelley School of Business alumni
1976 births
Living people